The Terzi T-9 Stiletto is an Italian two-seat light aircraft designed by Milanese aeronautical engineer Pietro Terzi who built a demonstrative prototype at his firm Terzi Aerodyne based in Milan, Italy.

Design and development
The Stiletto is a two-seat low-wing monoplane designed under FAR 23 regulations, that meets the FAA (LSA) Light Sport Aircraft rules. It is mainly metal construction but has a glassfibre cabin enclosure. It has a fixed nosewheel landing gear and is powered by a nose-mounted Rotax 912A piston engine. The cantilever wings and the demountable tailboom of aluminium alloy structure carrying the empennages can be detached for transport and storage.

Specifications

References

Notes

Bibliography

External links
 Pietro Terzi Aircraft

1990s Italian civil utility aircraft
Low-wing aircraft
Aircraft first flown in 1990